Grahn is a surname. Notable people with the surname include:

Anders Grahn (born 1979), Swedish songwriter, multi instrumentalist, vocal coach and producer
Anders Grahn (curler) (born 1958), Swedish curler
Bengt-Erik Grahn (1941–2019), Swedish alpine skier
Carl Grahn (born 1981), Finnish ice hockey player
Christian Grahn
Dieter Grahn
Elna Jane Hilliard Grahn
Judy Grahn
Lucile Grahn
Matilda Grahn
Nancy Lee Grahn
Ove Grahn
Sara Grahn
Sören Grahn (born 1962), Swedish curler and coach
Sture Grahn
Tobias Grahn
Ulf Grahn
Wallis Grahn
Richard Grahn lawyer President Massachusetts bar association